Yazdi cake is a cake native to Yazd in central Iran and is mostly used in Yazd Province itself for different ceremonies.

Its main ingredients are egg, sugar, solid oil or butter, white flour, sodium citrate, sodium bicarbonate, baking powder, yogurt, milk, cardamom and if needed raisins and sliced up pistachio.

References

Cakes
Iranian pastries